No Song Too Sacred is the third album by Australian rock band The Party Boys. It was recorded during a tour in 1984. The band's line-up on this release included the founding members Kevin Borich, Paul Christie and Graham Bidstrup along with former Skyhooks singer Shirley Strachan and Rose Tattoo/Jimmy Barnes guitarist Robin Riley. In keeping with the band's tradition, the album was recorded live and features only covers of tracks by artists including the Rolling Stones, Led Zeppelin, Spencer Davis Group, Jimi Hendrix, The Who, The Police and AC/DC. "Kashmir" was issued as a single but was not a hit.

Track listing
Brown Sugar (Jagger/Richards)
Foxy Lady (Hendrix) 
Walking on the Moon (Sting) 
Walking the Dog 
I'm a Man (Winwood/Miller)
Kashmir (Page/Plant/Bonham)
Immigrant Song (Page/Plant)
Crossroads (Johnson)
Let There Be Rock (Young/Young/Scott)
My Generation (Townshend)

Credits

 Shirley Strachan - vocals
 Kevin Borich - guitar
 Paul Christie - bass
 Graham Bidstrup - drums
 Robin Riley - guitar

1984 live albums
The Party Boys albums